Tungkillo (postcode 5236, altitude 299m) is a town in South Australia, located approximately  south of Mount Pleasant.

Tungkillo was originally the name of a mine located south of Palmer, which opened in 1847. In 1848, a town was surveyed at the mine, The present-day town was settled by Samuel Patten in 1861, who called it South Petherton (after the Somerset town of South Petherton from which his family originated). The name of South Petherton was officially altered on 24 January 1906 to Tungkillo, although the two names were used interchangeably as late as 1936.

Tungkillo is a corruption of tainkila, a Peramangk Aboriginal word meaning ghost moth grubs.

The historic former Terlinga Station Shearing Shed in Hoads Woolshed Road and a former grain threshing floor in Loxton Road are listed on the South Australian Heritage Register.

Tungkillo is in the Mid Murray Council local government area, the South Australian House of Assembly electoral district of Schubert and the Australian House of Representatives Division of Barker.

References

External links
 Map of Tungkillo (Mid Murray Council)

Towns in South Australia
1861 establishments in Australia